Pekwachnamaykoskwaskwaypinwanik Lake is a lake of Manitoba. The name is Cree for "where the wild trout are caught by fishing with hooks." It is the longest place name in Canada at 31 letters long. It is located just southeast of Red Sucker Lake in northeastern Manitoba, near its border with Ontario.

See also
 List of long place names

References

Lakes of Manitoba
Long words